Beatriz Hernández Trapote is a Spanish journalist.

Career 
In 2003, she began doing small odd jobs on Channel 4. In 2006 she made frequent appearances at the program of Telecinco, TNT. Later she  became a reporter for the late night program of Telecinco Vuélveme Loca and occasional collaborator of  the successful program Sálvame diario.

In May 2010, she was cover of the Interviú magazine and this year she participated in the reality show Supervivientes (España).

In 2010 summer she works as a partner at the morning program of Telecinco, El programa de Ana Rosa.

In March 2013, she participated in the program ¡Mira quién salta!.

Private life
On 3 November 2013 she married Víctor Janeiro in Jerez de la Frontera (Cádiz). Three days later, the pictures of their wedding were published exclusively by the magazine ¡HOLA! (HELLO! in the Spanish edition).

References

External links 
 

Spanish journalists
Living people
1981 births